Ray Howard was an American racecar driver from New York City. Howard made three Championship Car starts in 1919 - the 1919 Indianapolis 500 and two races on the Sheepshead Bay Race Track board oval in June of that year driving a Peugeot. He then drove a Peugeot in the 1920 Indianapolis 500. His final start came on the Uniontown Speedway board oval in 1922 driving a Ford and suffering a broken frame on lap 2.

Indy 500 results

References

Year of birth missing
Indianapolis 500 drivers
Racing drivers from New York City
Year of death missing